Dysgonia prorasigna is a moth of the family Noctuidae first described by George Hampson in 1913. It is found in Africa, including Uganda.

References

Dysgonia
Insects of Uganda
Moths of Africa